Ferenc Rudas (6 July 1921 – 11 February 2016) was a Hungarian football player, coach and administrator.

Career
Born in Budapest, Rudas played as a defender for Ferencváros, scoring 25 goals in 276 league appearances.

He was also a Hungarian international, scoring 3 goals in 23 games between 1943 and 1949.

After retiring as a player in 1954, he worked as a coach, for the Hungarian Football Federation, and on the board at Ferencváros.

He died on 11 February 2016 at the age of 94.

References

1921 births
2016 deaths
Hungarian footballers
Hungary international footballers
Ferencvárosi TC footballers
Association football defenders
Footballers from Budapest